Things in tha Hood is the second studio album by American rap duo DFC from Flint, Michigan. It was released on March 22, 1994 through the Atlantic Records subsidiary Big Beat Records. Production was handled by six record producers: DJ Slip and MC Eiht of Compton's Most Wanted, Warren G, The D.O.C., Cedric "Swift C" Barnett and the group's frequent collaborator MC Breed. It features guest appearances from MC Breed, MC Eiht, Warren G, Nate Dogg and Bushwick Bill. The album spawned two singles: "Caps Get Peeled" and "Things in tha Hood".

Background
DFC's previous album was a collaborative effort with MC Breed, but Things in tha Hood became a bigger success then any of DFC or MC Breed's albums, peaking at number 71 on the Billboard 200 and at number 7 on the Top R&B/Hip-Hop Albums. In addition to the album, both of its singles also reached the Billboard charts, made it to Hot R&B/Hip-Hop Songs and Hot Rap Songs charts.

Reception

Alex Henderson of AllMusic gave the album a solid three out of a possible five stars, stating "while DFC's lyrics are hardly innovative or groundbreaking by 1994 standards, the beats ultimately prove to be the saving grace of this enjoyable, if derivative, CD".

Track listing

Charts

Weekly charts

Year-end charts

References

External links

1994 albums
DFC (group) albums
Albums produced by Warren G
Albums produced by MC Eiht
Big Beat Records (American record label) albums